The Extraordinary and Plenipotentiary Ambassador of Peru to the Kingdom of Belgium, the Grand Duchy of Luxembourg and Head of Mission to the European Union is the official representative of the Republic of Peru to the Kingdom of Belgium and the Grand Duchy of Luxembourg who also serves as the Head of Mission to the European Union.

Peru is accredited to all three entities from its embassy in Brussels.

List of representatives

References

Belgium
Peru
Peru
Peru